Photinia kwangsiensis is a species in the family Rosaceae.

References

kwangsiensis